The term "Cultural Marxism" refers to a far-right antisemitic conspiracy theory which claims that Western Marxism is the basis of continuing academic and intellectual efforts to subvert Western culture. The conspiracy theory misrepresents the Frankfurt School as being responsible for modern progressive movements, identity politics, and political correctness, claiming there is an ongoing and intentional subversion of Western society via a planned culture war that undermines the Christian values of traditionalist conservatism and seeks to replace them with the culturally liberal values of the 1960s.

Although similarities with the Nazi propaganda term "Cultural Bolshevism" have been noted, the contemporary conspiracy theory originated in the United States during the 1990s. Originally found only on the far-right political fringe, the term began to enter mainstream discourse in the 2010s and is now found globally. The conspiracy theory of a Marxist culture war is promoted by right-wing politicians, fundamentalist religious leaders, political commentators in mainstream print and television media, and white supremacist terrorists, and has been described as "a foundational element of the alt-right worldview". Scholarly analysis of the conspiracy theory has concluded that it has no basis in fact.

Origins

Michael Minnicino and the LaRouche Movement 
The 1992 essay New Dark Age: The Frankfurt School and 'Political Correctness'  by Michael Minnicino was the starting point for the contemporary conspiracy theory in the United States. Minnicino argued that late twentieth-century America had become a "New Dark Age" as a result of the abandonment of Judeo-Christian and Renaissance ideals, which he claimed had been replaced in modern art with a "tyranny of ugliness". He attributed this to an alleged plot to instill cultural pessimism in America, carried out in three stages by Georg Lukács, the Frankfurt School, and elite media figures and political campaigners.

According to Minnicino, there were two aspects of the Frankfurt School plan to destroy Western culture. Firstly, a cultural critique, by Theodor Adorno and Walter Benjamin, to use art and culture to promote alienation and replace Christianity with socialism. This included the development of opinion polling and advertising techniques to brainwash the populace and control political campaigning. Secondly, the plan supposedly included attacks on the traditional family structure by Herbert Marcuse and Erich Fromm to promote women's rights, sexual liberation, and polymorphous perversity to subvert patriarchal authority. Minnicino claimed the Frankfurt School was responsible for elements of the counterculture of the 1960s and a "psychedelic revolution", distributing hallucinogenic drugs to encourage sexual perversion and promiscuity.

Minnicino's interest in the subject derived from his involvement in the LaRouche movement. Lyndon LaRouche began developing conspiracy theories regarding the Frankfurt School in 1974, when he alleged that Herbert Marcuse and Angela Davis were acting as part of COINTELPRO. Other features of the conspiracy theory developed across the 1970s and 80s in the movement's magazine, EIR. After the 2011 Norway attacks, Minnicino repudiated his own essay, writing, "I still like to think that some of my research was validly conducted and useful. However, I see very clearly that the whole enterprise—and especially the conclusions—was hopelessly deformed by self-censorship and the desire to in some way support Mr. LaRouche’s crack-brained world-view."

Paul Weyrich and William Lind 
In a speech to the Conservative Leadership Conference of the Civitas Institute in 1998, Paul Weyrich equated Cultural Marxism to political correctness. Paul Weyrich argued that "we have lost the culture war" and that "a legitimate strategy for us to follow is to look at ways to separate ourselves from the institutions that have been captured by the ideology of Political Correctness, or by other enemies of our traditional culture."

For the Free Congress Research and Education Foundation, Weyrich commissioned William Lind to write a history of Cultural Marxism, defined as "a brand of Western Marxism ... commonly known as 'multiculturalism' or, less formally, Political Correctness." In the speech The Origins of Political Correctness, Lind wrote, "If we look at it analytically, if we look at it historically, we quickly find out exactly what it is. Political correctness is cultural Marxism. It is Marxism translated from economic into cultural terms. It is an effort that goes back not to the 1960s and the Hippies and the peace movement, but back to World War I. If we compare the basic tenets of Political Correctness with classical Marxism, the parallels are very obvious."

According to Lind's analysis, Lukács and Gramsci aimed to subvert Western culture because it was an obstacle to the Marxist goal of proletarian revolution. According to Lind, the Frankfurt School under Max Horkheimer aimed to remove social inhibitions (and destroy Western culture) using four main strategies. First, Horkheimer's critical theory would undermine the authority of the traditional family and government institutions, while segregating society into opposing groups of victims and oppressors. Second, the concepts of the authoritarian personality and the F-scale, developed by Adorno, would be used to accuse Americans with right-wing views of having fascist principles. Third, the concept of polymorphous perversity would undermine Western culture by promoting free love and homosexuality. Lind said that Herbert Marcuse considered a coalition of "Blacks, students, feminist women, and homosexuals" as a feasible vanguard of cultural revolution in the 1960s. Marcuse's Repressive Tolerance is interpreted by Lind as an argument to silence the right, and allow only the left to be heard. Lind also wrote that Cultural Marxism was an example of fourth-generation warfare.

Pat Buchanan brought more attention among paleoconservatives to Weyrich and Lind's iteration of the conspiracy theory. Jérôme Jamin refers to Buchanan as the "intellectual momentum" of the conspiracy theory, and to Anders Breivik as the "violent impetus". Both of them relied on William Lind, who edited a multi-authored work called "Political Correctness: A Short History of an Ideology" that Jamin calls the core text that "has been unanimously cited as 'the' reference since 2004."

Lind and the Council of Conservative Citizens produced a video documentary Political Correctness: The Frankfurt School in 1999. The film includes decontextualized clips of historian Martin Jay, who was not aware of the nature of the production at the time. Jay has since become a recognized expert on the conspiracy theory. Concerning right-wing exploitation of his statements, Jay wrote, "Those beans I allegedly spilled had been on the plate for a very long time," going on to confirm that the Frankfurt school were Marxists concerned with culture, and that Marcuse promulgated the idea of repressive tolerance. However, the conspiracy theory presents an "improverished cartoon version" of these ideas.

Jay wrote that Lind's documentary was effective Cultural Marxism propaganda because it "spawned a number of condensed, textual versions, which were reproduced on a number of radical, right-wing [web] sites." Jay further writes:
These, in turn, led to a plethora of new videos, now available on YouTube, which feature an odd cast of pseudo-experts regurgitating exactly the same line. The message is numbingly simplistic: All the 'ills' of modern American culture, from feminism, affirmative action, sexual liberation, racial equality, multiculturalism and gay rights to the decay of traditional education, and even environmentalism, are ultimately attributable to the insidious intellectual influence of the members of the Institute for Social Research who came to America in the 1930s.

Frankfurt School 

Apart from any conspiratorial usage, the phrase 'cultural Marxism' has been occasionally used in accepted academic scholarship to mean the study of how the production of culture is used by elite groups to maintain their dominance. Generally no one self-identifies as a 'cultural Marxist'. 'Cultural Marxism' is sometimes treated as synonymous with the 'Critical Theory' that originated in the Frankfurt School; the name 'Critical Theory' was coined as a euphemism for Marxism. More generally, Western Marxism, a broad trend of scholarship outside Russia that refocused Marxist thought from its original domain of economics towards culture, is also known as 'cultural Marxism'.

A group of Western Marxists including Felix Weil, Karl Korsch, and György Lukács founded the Institute for Social Research in Frankfurt around 1922 and 1923. Seeking to explain the failure of the German Revolution of 1918–1919, they combined Marx's economic analyses with other lines of thought about psychology and culture, especially the works of Sigmund Freud. Around 1929, Max Horkheimer began the school of thought that came to be known as the Frankfurt School or Critical Theory, which grew to encompass numerous contributors directly engaged with the Institute for Social Research and others outside it. Recognizing the imminent danger of Nazism, in 1935 Horkheimer relocated the institute to Columbia University in New York. Thereafter, it became a driving force of the Frankfurt school to understand the rise of totalitarianism so that it could be prevented from repeating. In works including Horkheimer and Theodor Adorno's book Dialectic of Enlightenment and Herbert Marcuse's Eros and Civilization they analyzed the culture industry in terms of Marxist labor theory and Freudian psychoanalysis. They were concerned about mass media's ability to instill false consciousness, and Adorno proposed the concept of an authoritarian personality that rendered citizens in liberal democracies vulnerable to being swept up in fascist movements.

After the war, Adorno and Horkheimer returned to Germany, and the Frankfurt School continued on in a second generation exemplified by Jürgen Habermas. Herbert Marcuse remained in America, where he became a controversial public figure associated with the New Left. Through his writing on Repressive Tolerance and advising students such as Angela Davis and Rudi Dutschke, Marcuse played a dramatic role in the civil rights movement and West German student movement. In contrast, most members of the Frankfurt School avoided such involvement. After the New Left declined in the 1970s, critical pedagogy — a concept with origins in the Frankfurt School — became a major current in American universities. Critical pedagogy contributed to controversy about political correctness in the 1990s.

Conspiratorial interpretations 
Conspiracy theories claim that an elite of Marxist theorists and Frankfurt School intellectuals are subverting Western society. Although some theories make reference to actual thinkers and ideas selected from the Western Marxist tradition, they severely misrepresent the subject, and they give an exaggerated interpretation of their effective influence. None of the Frankfurt School's members were part of any kind of international conspiracy to destroy Western civilization. According to Marc Tuters, "the analysis of Marxism proffered by this literature would certainly not stand up to scrutiny by any serious historian of the subject." Conspiracy theorists misrepresent the nature of Theodor Adorno's work on the Princeton Radio Project, wherein Adorno sought to understand the ability of mass media to influence the public, which he saw as a danger to be mitigated, rather than a plan to be implemented.

Some of the many ways the various versions of the conspiracy theory diverge from reality include:
 Whether individuals associated with the Frankfurt School are responsible for particular acts at particular times, or whether they are responsible for trends across large spans of space and time
 The goals of the Frankfurt School — whether it was to free the oppressed, or to destroy those institutions they criticized for having an oppressive quality
 How successful or unsuccessful the Frankfurt School was in achieving its goals

Conspiracy theorists position themselves as defending "Western civilization", which serves as a floating signifier often focusing on capitalism and freedom of speech. The conspiracy theory is an extreme assessment of political correctness, accusing the latter of being a project to destroy Christianity, nationalism, and the nuclear family. Scholars associated with the Frankfurt School sought to create a better society by warning against patriarchy and capitalist exploitation, goals that could seem threatening to others who have an interest in maintaining the status quo. This has been disputed by some critics, who have suggested that the Frankfurt School's theory of historical development gives tacit support to patriarchy and imperialism.

Classical Marxism tended to focus on economics and dismiss cultural matters as superstructure, but this tendency was reversed in Western Marxism. The Frankfurt School critiqued the culture industry and its ability to undermine class consciousness, then later it began to examine the culture industry as a kind of base productive sector. This shift coincided with the rise of the New Left and a pivot from working classes to intellectuals as a revolutionary vanguard. According to Sven Lütticken, the narrative of a progressive long march through the institutions resembles actual events, apart from the "extreme, borderline-magical" agency that the conspiracy theory attributes to a handfull of sociologists.

Conspiracy theorists exaggerate the real influence of Western Marxists. By contrast, Stuart Jeffries noted their "negligible real-world impact", while Jürgen Habermas criticized what he called their "strategy of hibernation", noting that Frankfurt School figures were mostly content to complain about the world rather than attempting to change it. Jeffries wrote: "The Frankfurt conspiracy theory, which has captivated several alt-right figures including [Donald] Trump, Jordan Peterson and the late Andrew Breitbart, founder of the eponymous news service, turned this history on its head. Rather than impotent professors issuing scarcely comprehensible jeremiads from the academy, the likes of Adorno, Horkheimer, Erich Fromm and Herbert Marcuse were a crack cadre of subversives, who, during their American exile, performed a cultural takedown to which 'Make America Great Again' is a belated riposte." According to Joan Braune, Cultural Marxism in the sense referred to by the conspiracy theorists never existed, and does not correspond to any historical school of thought. She also states that Frankfurt School scholars are referred to as "Critical Theorists", not "Cultural Marxists". She points out that, contrary to the claims of the conspiracy theorists, postmodernism tends to be wary of or even hostile towards Marxism, including towards the grand narratives typically supported by Critical Theory.

In a 2019 addendum to Dialectic of Counter-Enlightenment, Martin Jay wrote that the conspiracy theory's enduring circulation calls for deeper analysis than simple ridicule. He suggests a starting point for investigation to be the Frankfurt School's analysis of the authoritarian personality and the reception of this idea on the right. From the beginning in Minnicino's essay, the conspiracy theory has identified the authoritarian personality concept as an instrument for promulgating political correctness. By pathologizing political commitments as a form of mental illness, the authoritarian personality concept denies personal agency and the possibility of change. Fromm, Habermas, and Peter E. Gordon, among others, have raised cautionary notes about this tendency. The conspiracy theory however draws unfounded inferences from the Frankfurt School's various post-war government funding sources to vastly overstate Adorno's influence on government policy. Nonetheless, the authoritarian personality scale has been wielded rhetorically against populism and the alt-right since 2016. Jay concludes it is, "counterproductive to pathologize their politics too quickly and subsume them under theoretical categories that rob them of any critical self-reflectivity or ability to alter their views or behavior."

Terrorism 

On July 22, 2011, Anders Breivik murdered 77 people in the 2011 Norway attacks. About 90 minutes before enacting the violence, Breivik e-mailed 1,003 people his manifesto 2083: A European Declaration of Independence and a copy of Political Correctness: A Short History of an Ideology. Cultural Marxism was the primary subject of Breivik's manifesto. Breivik wrote that the "sexually transmitted disease (STD) epidemic in Western Europe is a result of cultural Marxism", that "Cultural Marxism defines Muslims, feminist women, homosexuals, and some additional minority groups, as virtuous, and they view ethnic Christian European men as evil" and that the "European Court of Human Rights (ECHR) in Strasbourg is a cultural-Marxist-controlled political entity."

A number of other far-right terrorists have espoused the conspiracy theory. Jack Renshaw, a neo-Nazi child sex offender convicted of plotting the assassination of Labour MP Rosie Cooper, promoted the conspiracy theory in a video for the British National Party. John T. Earnest, the perpetrator of the 2019 Poway synagogue shooting, was inspired by white nationalist ideology. In an online manifesto, Earnest stated that he believed "every Jew is responsible for the meticulously planned genocide of the European race" through the promotion of "cultural Marxism and communism."

Reactions 
Concerning the real-life political violence caused by the conspiracy theory, law professor Samuel Moyn wrote: "That 'cultural Marxism' is a crude slander, referring to something that does not exist, unfortunately does not mean actual people are not being set up to pay the price, as scapegoats, to appease a rising sense of anger and anxiety. And for that reason, 'cultural Marxism' is not only a sad diversion from framing legitimate grievances but also a dangerous lure in an increasingly unhinged moment."

Antisemitism 
The author Matthew Rose wrote that arguments by the American neo-Nazi Francis Parker Yockey after World War II were an early example of the conspiracy theory.

William Lind on one occasion presented his theories at a Holocaust denial conference.

According to Samuel Moyn, "[t]he wider discourse around cultural Marxism today resembles nothing so much as a version of the Jewish Bolshevism myth updated for a new age." Maxime Dafaure likewise states that Cultural Marxism is a contemporary update of antisemitic conspiracy theories, such as the Nazi concept of "Cultural Bolshevism", and is directly associated with the concept of "Jewish Bolshevism". According to philosopher Slavoj Žižek, the term Cultural Marxism "plays the same structural role as that of the 'Jewish plot' in anti-Semitism: it projects (or rather, transposes) the immanent antagonism of our socio-economic life onto an external cause: what the conservative alt-right deplores as the ethical disintegration of our lives (feminism, attacks on patriarchy, political correctness, etc.) must have an external cause—because it cannot, for them, emerge out of the antagonisms and tensions of our own societies."

Andrew Woods in the essay "Cultural Marxism and the Cathedral: Two Alt-Right Perspectives on Critical Theory" (2019), acknowledges comparisons to Cultural Bolshevism, but argues against the idea the modern conspiracy theory was derived from Nazi propaganda. He writes instead that its antisemitism is "profoundly American". In Commune magazine, Woods detailed a genealogy of the conspiracy theory beginning with the LaRouche movement.

Kevin MacDonald has written several anti-semitic texts centering on the Frankfurt School. MacDonald criticized Breivik's manifesto for not being more hostile to Jews.

Circulation in the alt-right 
Neo-Nazi and white supremacists promoted the conspiracy theory and help expand its reach. Websites such as the American Renaissance have run articles with titles like "Cultural Marxism in Action: Media Matters Engineers Cancellation of Vdare.com Conference". The Daily Stormer regularly runs stories about "Cultural Marxism" with titles such as "Jewish Cultural Marxism is Destroying Abercrombie & Fitch", "Hollywood Strikes Again: Cultural Marxism through the Medium of Big Box-Office Movies" and "The Left-Center-Right Political Spectrum of Immigration = Cultural Marxism".

Neo-nazis associated with Stormfront have strategically used the Frankfurt School as a euphemism to refer to Jewish people more generally, in venues where more forthright anti-semitism would be censored or rejected.

Timothy Matthews criticized the Frankfurt School from an explicitly Christian right perspective in the Catholic weekly newspaper The Wanderer. According to Matthews, the Frankfurt School, under the influence of Satan, seeks to destroy the traditional Christian family using critical theory and Marcuse's concept of polymorphous perversity, thereby encouraging homosexuality and breaking down the patriarchal family. Andrew Woods wrote that the plot Matthews describes does not resemble the Frankfurt School so much as the alleged aims of communists in The Naked Communist by W. Cleon Skousen.
Nonetheless, Matthews' account was circulated credulously by right-wing and alt-right news media as well as in far-right internet forums such including Stormfront.

Following the Norway attacks, the conspiracy theory was taken up by a number of far-right outlets and forums, including alt-right websites such as AltRight Corporation, InfoWars and VDARE which have promoted the theory. The AltRight Corporation's website, altright.com, featured articles with titles such as "Ghostbusters and the Suicide of Cultural Marxism", "#3 — Sweden: The World Capital of Cultural Marxism" and "Beta Leftists, Cultural Marxism and Self-Entitlement". InfoWars ran numerous headlines such as "Is Cultural Marxism America's New Mainline Ideology?" VDARE ran similar articles with similar titles such as "Yes, Virginia (Dare) There Is A Cultural Marxism—And It's Taking Over Conservatism Inc."

Richard B. Spencer, head of the National Policy Institute, has promoted the conspiracy theory. Spencer's master's thesis was on the topic of Theodor Adorno.

Jewish supporters 

There are some notable Jewish supporters of the conspiracy theory. Paul Gottfried was at one time a student of Herbert Marcuse (with whom he disagreed) and edited Telos. Under Gottfried's tenure, Telos became far-right in its outlook, writing favorably about Carl Schmitt and Alain de Benoist. Gottfried influenced Richard Spencer and has been called the "godfather" of the alt-right. He defended William Lind against accusations that "Cultural Marxism" has anti-semitic undertones. Gottfried identifies as reactionary and questions the value of political equality. Gottfried defines cultural Marxism as "a particular movement for change that combines some elements of Marxist socialism with a call for sexual and cultural revolution". However, he says that the term "cultural Marxism" is not ideal since the connection with Marxism is tenuous. Gottfried writes that the influence of the Frankfurt School lives on in modern left-wing politics mainly in the form of a tendency to conflate the right wing with fascism.

Other Jewish supporters include Ralph de Toledano, Andrew Breitbart, Ben Shapiro, David Horowitz, and Stephen Miller.

Jewish supporters of the conspiracy theory are generally more paleoconservative (a term coined by Gottfried) than neoconservative. Martin Jay calls the number of Jewish proponents of the conspiracy theory "puzzling and uncomfortable."

Entering the mainstream 
Rachel Busbridge, Benjamin Moffitt and Joshua Thorburn describe the conspiracy theory as being promoted by the far-right, but that it "has gained ground over the past quarter century" and conclude that "[t]hrough the lens of the Cultural Marxist conspiracy, however, it is possible to discern a relationship of empowerment between mainstream and fringe, whereby certain talking points and tropes are able to be transmitted, taken up and adapted by 'mainstream' figures, thus giving credence and visibility to ideologies that would have previously been constrained to the margins."

Andrew Breitbart, founder of Breitbart News, authored a 2011 book Righteous Indignation: Excuse Me While I Save the World that represents one of the conspiracy theory's moves towards the mainstream. Breitbart's interpretation of the conspiracy is similar in most respects to that of Lind. Breitbart attributes the spread of the ideas of the Frankfurt School from universities to a wider audience to "trickledown intellectualism", and claims that Saul Alinsky introduced cultural Marxism to the masses in his 1971 handbook Rules for Radicals. Woods argues that Breitbart focuses on Alinsky in order to associate cultural Marxism with the modern Democratic Party, and Hillary Clinton. Breitbart claims that George Soros funds the alleged cultural Marxism project. Martin Jay wrote that Breitbart's book displayed "appalling ignorance" of the actual work of the Frankfurt School.

Breitbart News has published the idea that Theodor Adorno's atonal music was an attempt at inducing the population to necrophilia on a mass scale. Former Breitbart contributors Ben Shapiro and Charlie Kirk, founder of Turning Point USA, have promoted the conspiracy theory, especially the claim that Cultural Marxist activity is happening in universities.

In the late 2010s, Canadian clinical psychologist Jordan Peterson popularized "Cultural Marxism" as a term, moving it into mainstream discourse. Several writers stated that Peterson blamed "Cultural Marxism" for demanding the use of gender-neutral pronouns as a threat to free speech, often misusing postmodernism as a stand-in term for the conspiracy without understanding its antisemitic implications, specifying that "Peterson isn't an ideological anti-Semite; there's every reason to believe that when he re-broadcasts fascist propaganda, he doesn't even hear the dog-whistles he's emitting".

In 2015, after the Star Wars: The Force Awakens trailer release, one of the initial Twitter accounts that spread accusations that the film was "anti-white" (because its lead characters were not white men) had the tagline "End Cultural Marxism" and promoted the conspiracy theory. 

In June 2018, Ron Paul posted a tweet containing a racist cartoon and a caption which mentioned Cultural Marxism. The tweet read "Are you stunned by what has become of American culture? Well, it's not an accident. You've probably heard of 'Cultural Marxism,’ but do you know what it means?". The tweet was later deleted with an apology, stating that a staff member had inadvertently posted what Paul described as an "offensive cartoon".

In a 2020 New York Times opinion column, Ross Douthat equated Cultural Marxism with what Wesley Yang calls the successor ideology.

Concerns for false balance 
Spencer Sunshine, an associate fellow at the Political Research Associates, stated that "the focus on the Frankfurt School by the right serves to highlight its inherent Jewishness." In particular, Paul and Sunshine have criticized traditional media such as The New York Times, New York Magazine and The Washington Post for their coverage of the conspiracy theory, arguing that they have either not clarified the nature of the conspiracy theory or "allow[ed] it to live on their pages." An example is an article in The New York Times by David Brooks, who Paul and Sunshine argue "rebrands cultural Marxism as mere political correctness, giving the Nazi-inspired phrase legitimacy for the American right. It is dropped in or quoted in other stories—some of them lighthearted, like the fashion cues of the alt-right—without describing how fringe this notion is. It's akin to letting conspiracy theories about chem trails or vaccines get unearned space in mainstream press." Another is Andrew Sullivan, who went on "to denounce 'cultural Marxists' for inspiring social justice movements on campuses." Paul and Sunshine argued that failure to highlight the nature of the conspiracy theory "has bitter consequences. 'It is legitimizing the use of that framework, and therefore it's [sic] coded antisemitism.'"

Sociologists Julia Lux and John David Jordan assert that the conspiracy theory can be broken down into its key elements: "misogynist anti-feminism, neo-eugenic science (broadly defined as various forms of genetic determinism), genetic and cultural white supremacy, McCarthyist anti-Leftism fixated on postmodernism, radical anti-intellectualism applied to the social sciences, and the idea that a purge is required to restore normality." They go on to say that all of these items are "supported, proselytised and academically buoyed by intellectuals, politicians, and media figures with extremely credible educational backgrounds."

Political discourses 
In "Taking On Hate: One NGO's Strategies" (2009), the political scientist Heidi Beirich said that the Cultural Marxism theory demonizes the cultural bêtes noires of conservatism such as feminists, LGBT social movements, secular humanists, multiculturalists, sex educators, environmentalists, immigrants and black nationalists.

Jamin writes on the flexibility of the conspiracy theory to serve the rhetorical purposes of different groups with diverse sets of enemies:

In "Liberalism and Socialism Mortal Enemies Or Embittered Kin?" (2021), professor Aaron Hanlon said that "the objectives of proponents of conspiratorial views about Cultural Marxism were (and are) not to give a current account of Critical Theory, but to advance a conservative version of US liberalism against the scapegoat of global conspiracy theory." and "In short, what Critical Theory provides to those who use 'critical theory' to signal a socialist threat to liberalism is not only a link to Marxist thought, but also a straw man against which to advance neoliberal politics."

Australia 
Shortly after the Norway attacks, mainstream right-wing politicians began espousing the conspiracy. In 2013, Cory Bernardi, a member of the ruling Liberal Party, wrote in his book The Conservative Revolution that "cultural Marxism has been one of the most corrosive influences on society over the last century." Five years later, Fraser Anning, former Australian Senator, initially sitting as a member of Pauline Hanson's One Nation and then Katter's Australian Party, declared during his maiden speech in 2018 that "Cultural Marxism is not a throwaway line but a literal truth" and spoke of the need for a "final solution to the immigration problem."

Brazil 
In Brazil, the government of Jair Bolsonaro contained a number of administration members who promoted the conspiracy theory, including Eduardo Bolsonaro, the president's son who "enthusiastically described Steve Bannon as an opponent of Cultural Marxism." Jair Bolsonaro sought to expunge the influence of Paulo Freire from Brazilian universities. This had the opposite effect, driving sales of Freire's book Pedagogy of the Oppressed.

Cuba 
In 2010, former head of state Fidel Castro called attention to a version of the conspiracy theory by Daniel Estulin, which proposed that the Bilderberg Group sought to influence world events via the spread of rock and roll music. Estulin's work was based on Minnicino's 1992 essay which emphasized Adorno's involvement in the Radio Research Project. Martin Jay described Estulin's text as "risible" and explained that, although some in the Frankfurt School wrote about the potential for mass media to pacify labor movements, it was something they lamented rather than planned to implement. Castro invited Estulin to Cuba, where they issued a joint statement claiming Osama bin Laden was a CIA asset and that the United States was planning a nuclear war against Russia. In 2019, Jay wrote that Castro's interest in the conspiracy theory had no long-term consequences.

United Kingdom 
During the Brexit debate in 2019, a number of Conservatives and Brexiteers espoused the conspiracy theory.

Suella Braverman, the Conservative Member of Parliament (MP), said in a pro-Brexit speech for the Bruges Group, a Eurosceptic think tank, that "[w]e are engaging in many battles right now. As Conservatives, we are engaged in a battle against cultural Marxism, where banning things is becoming de rigueur, where freedom of speech is becoming a taboo, where our universities — quintessential institutions of liberalism — are being shrouded in censorship and a culture of no-platforming." Her usage of the conspiracy theory was condemned as hate speech by other MPs, the Board of Deputies of British Jews and the anti-racist organization Hope Not Hate. After meeting with her later, the Board of Deputies of British Jews said that she is "not in any way antisemitic." Braverman was alerted to this connection by journalist Dawn Foster, but she defended using the term. Braverman denied that the term Cultural Marxism is an antisemitic trope, stating during a question and answer session "whether she stood by the term, given its far-right connections. She said: 'Yes, I do believe we are in a battle against cultural Marxism, as I said. We have culture evolving from the far left which has allowed the snuffing out of freedom of speech, freedom of thought.'" Braverman further added that she was "very aware of that ongoing creep of cultural Marxism, which has come from Jeremy Corbyn."

Nigel Farage has promoted the cultural Marxist conspiracy theory, for which he has been condemned by Jewish groups such as the Board of Deputies of British Jews as well as a number of Members of Parliament who said he used it as a dog-whistle code for antisemitism in the United Kingdom. Farage said that the United Kingdom faced "cultural Marxism", a term described in its report by The Guardian as "originating in a conspiracy theory based on a supposed plot against national governments, which is closely linked to the far right and antisemitism." Farage's spokesman "condemned previous criticism of his language by Jewish groups and others as 'pathetic' and 'a manufactured story.'"

In The War Against the BBC (2020), Patrick Barwise and Peter York write how the Cultural Marxism conspiracy theory has been pushed by some on the right as part of an alleged bias of the BBC. Yasmin Alibhai-Brown cites Dominic Cummings, Tim Montgomerie and the right-wing website Guido Fawkes as examples of "relentlessly [complaining] about the institution's 'cultural Marxism' or left-wing bias. This now happens on a near-daily basis."

In November 2020 a letter signed by 28 Conservative MPs published in The Telegraph accused the National Trust of being "coloured by cultural Marxist dogma, colloquially known as the 'woke agenda'". The use of this terminology in the letter was described by the All-Party Parliamentary Group Against Antisemitism, Jewish Council for Racial Equality, anti-racist charity Hope Not Hate and the Campaign Against Antisemitism as antisemitic.

United States 
Cultural Marxism discourse was found in several strands of U.S. right-wing politics post-2000, including the religious right and the Tea Party movement.

Shortly after the election of Donald Trump, Alex Ross wrote an article in The New Yorker titled, "The Frankfurt School Knew Trump was Coming". It argued that Trump represented the kind of authoritarian identified by Theodor Adorno's F-scale. This idea prompted academic conferences on the same theme at the New School for Social Research and the Leo Baeck Institute. Martin Jay linked election rhetoric of Trump supporters as "deplorables" to Adorno's authoritarian personality concept, saying it "counterproductively forecloses treating those it categorized as anything but objects of contempt." Jay encouraged empathy and dialogue to resolve political polarization.

In 2017, it was reported that advisor Richard Higgins was fired from the United States National Security Council for publishing the memorandum '"POTUS & Political Warfare" that alleged the existence of a left-wing conspiracy to destroy Donald Trump's presidency because "American public intellectuals of Cultural Marxism, foreign Islamicists, and globalist bankers, the news media, and politicians from the Republican and Democratic parties were attacking Trump, because he represents an existential threat to the cultural Marxist memes that dominate the prevailing cultural narrative in the US." Higgins also asserted that the Frankfurt School "sought to deconstruct everything in order to destroy it, giving rise to society-wide nihilism." The memo was read by Donald Trump Jr. who passed on a copy of it to his father.

Matt Shea, a Washington Representative from the Republican Party, is a proponent of the conspiracy theory.

Gamergate 
Gamergate was an online harassment campaign beginning in 2014, particularly targeting women, that had the purported aim of promoting ethics in video games journalism. Participants in Gamergate referred to their opposition as cultural Marxists, and cited free-speech grounds to justify harassing their targets. Noted harassment associated with the online movement included doxing, swatting, and threats of rape and death. Torill Mortensen and Tanja Sihvonen described one Gamergate figure's connection of cultural Marxism with the Frankfurt School as "to a certain degree correct" but conflated with old and unfounded conspiracy theories. Michael Salter noted the role of new online platforms in the abuse and hostility toward women; his analysis used elements of critical theory including technological rationality. The Southern Poverty Law Center described the Gamergate campaign as one in a number of examples of male supremacy, which it said views society as "a matriarchy propped up by 'cultural Marxism' meant to eradicate or subjugate men".

See also 

 Andinia Plan
 Antisemitic canard
 Blood libel
 Cultural Bolshevism
 Doctors' plot
 Great Replacement
 Pizzagate conspiracy theory
 The Eternal Jew (art exhibition)
 The Foundations of the Nineteenth Century
 Franklin Prophecy
 The International Jew
 The Protocols of the Elders of Zion
 Jewish Bolshevism
 Judeo-Masonic conspiracy theory
 Kosher tax conspiracy theory
 QAnon
 Rootless cosmopolitan
 Stab-in-the-back myth
 Well poisoning
 White genocide conspiracy theory
 Zionist Occupation Government conspiracy theory
 Żydokomuna

Notes

References

Further reading 
 
 
 
 
 
 
 
 
 
 
 
 

1992 neologisms
2011 Norway attacks
Alt-right
Antisemitic canards
Conspiracy theories in Europe
Conspiracy theories involving Jews
Conspiracy theories in the United States
Criticism of multiculturalism
Fascist propaganda
LaRouche movement
Marxism